Steve Gansey (born October 17, 1985) is an American former basketball player and head coach for the College Park Skyhawks of the NBA G League. He attended Cleveland State and Ashland University.

Playing career
Steve Gansey played NCAA Division II basketball for the Ashland Eagles, after playing his freshman and sophomore years with the Division I Cleveland State Vikings.

Coaching career
Steve Gansey began his coaching career with the Fort Wayne Mad Ants from 2009 to 2014, he served as an assistant coach. From 2011 to 2012 he served as interim head coach.

On October 2, 2015, he was named the head coach of the Fort Wayne Mad Ants after serving as the associate head coach of the Canton Charge.

In 2021, he was named the head coach of the College Park Skyhawks, the NBA G League affiliate of the Atlanta Hawks.

Career stats

Coaching

|-
|rowspan="6" style="text-align:left;"|Fort Wayne
|style="text-align:left;"|2011–12
| 35 || 9 || 26 ||  || style="text-align:center;"|8th in Eastern || — || — || — || —
| style="text-align:center;"|Missed Playoffs
|-
|style="text-align:left;"|2015–16
| 50 || 20 || 30 ||  || style="text-align:center;"|5th in Central || — || — || — || —
| style="text-align:center;"|Missed Playoffs
|-
|style="text-align:left;"|2016–17
| 50 || 30 || 20 ||  || style="text-align:center;"|2nd in Central || 3 || 1 || 2 || 
| style="text-align:center;"| Lost First Round (Maine) 1–2
|-
|style="text-align:left;"|2017–18
| 50 || 29 || 21 ||  || style="text-align:center;"|1st in Central || 1 || 0 || 1 || 
| style="text-align:center;"| Lost Conf. Semifinal (Erie) 116–119
|-
|style="text-align:left;"|2018–19
| 50 || 23 || 27 ||  || style="text-align:center;"|3rd in Central || — || — || — || —
| style="text-align:center;"|Missed Playoffs
|-
|style="text-align:left;"|2019–20
| 43 || 21 || 22 ||  || style="text-align:center;"|4th in Central || — || — || — || —
| style="text-align:center;"|Season cancelled by COVID-19 pandemic
|-
|- class="sortbottom"
!scope="row" style="text-align:left;"|Career
| || 278 || 132 || 146 ||  || || 4 || 1 || 3 ||

Personal life
Steve's older brother Mike, a former star player at West Virginia University, is currently assistant general manager of the NBA's Cleveland Cavaliers.

References

1985 births
Living people
American men's basketball players
Ashland Eagles men's basketball players
Basketball coaches from Ohio
Basketball players from Ohio
Canton Charge coaches
Cleveland State Vikings men's basketball players
Fort Wayne Mad Ants coaches
People from Olmsted Falls, Ohio
Sportspeople from Cuyahoga County, Ohio
Guards (basketball)